Statistics of Portuguese Liga in the 1978–79 season.

Overview
It was contested by 16 teams, and F.C. Porto won the championship.

League standings

Results

Season statistics

Top goalscorers

Footnotes

External links
 Portugal 1978-79 - RSSSF (Jorge Miguel Teixeira)
 Portuguese League 1978/79 - footballzz.co.uk
 Portugal - Table of Honor - Soccer Library 
 Portuguese Wikipedia - Campeonato Português de Futebol - I Divisão 1978/1979

Primeira Liga seasons
1978–79 in Portuguese football
Portugal